Robert H. Lowe was an English professional footballer who played as an inside forward. He played three matches in the Football League for Burnley.

References

Year of birth unknown
English footballers
Association football forwards
Burnley F.C. players
English Football League players
Congleton Town F.C. players
Year of death missing